The Helpe Mineure (literally Helpe Minor or Little Helpe) is a river in France, which flows thorough the regions of Hauts-de-France. It arises in the municipality of Ohain at the confluence of two source streams. The river drains and flows in a generally north-westerly direction for about  it flows into its confluence as a southern tributary of the Sambre north-west of Maroilles.

References

Rivers of the Ardennes (France)
Rivers of France
Rivers of Hauts-de-France
Rivers of Nord (French department)